Jean Pierre Essome is a Cameroonian musician and actor.  He is known for his makossa music.  Essome is featured in the movie Before the Sunrise, released in Cameroon and Nigeria.

References

External links

Year of birth missing (living people)
Living people
Cameroonian musicians
Place of birth missing (living people)
Cameroonian male actors